Konstantinos Poulis (Greek: Κωνσταντίνος Πουλής; born 1973) is a Greek journalist, author, playwright and theater practitioner. He is best known for his political and cultural commentary and analysis of issues related to the ongoing Greek government-debt crisis. He is also host and head writer of the YouTube show Anaskopisi (Roundup), a satirical news show that in style and tone resembles American satirical programming such as The Daily Show, The Colbert Report, and Last Week Tonight.

References

Greek journalists
Greek satirists
Living people
Year of birth missing (living people)
Journalists from Athens